pH7Builder (formerly known as pH7CMS and 'pH7 Social Dating CMS) is an open-source social community software written by Pierre-Henry Soria that allows the creation of online communities and social dating services.

pH7Builder is written in PHP 7.4, is object-oriented and uses the MVC pattern (Model-View-Controller).

The software is based on the homemade pH7Framework and is designed with the KISS principle in mind. For better flexibility, the software uses PDO (PHP Data Objects) abstraction which allows the choice of the database. The principle of development is DRY (Don't Repeat Yourself) aims at reducing the repetition of information of all kinds (no code duplication).

It also aims to be fast, low-resource-intensive, extremely powerful, and very secure.

Improvement history

 In pH7CMS 1.0.10, the template syntax has been totally rewritten and gives a better understanding for Web designers.
 pH7CMS 1.1 introduced a new hash algorithm password and uses from now the Password Hashing API introduced by PHP 5.5. The version also includes many bug fixes, some new features and removes the Donation plugin from the Page module.
 pH7CMS 1.1.2 provide a huge improvement for the Payment module, a lot of bug fixes and a better Database Language integration.
 pH7CMS 1.1.8 is the last version of the 1.1 branch.
 From the 1.2 version, the software has a full responsive design.
 The 1.2 version is also more focused on "Dating features than the 1.0 and 1.1 branches.
 Since pH7CMS 1.2, the company doesn't only provide a "dating software provider", but also a Real Social/Dating Business Solution with support from the "dating idea startup" until the "profitable and popular online dating business". The service is mainly provided by e-Dating Marketing.
 pH7CMS 1.2.1 becomes the first dating software provider to offer Bitcoin as a payment gateway. Bitcoin is very appreciated on a dating websites because it allows people to make payments in an anonymous way.
 pH7CMS 1.2.3 has a new module called "api" allowing to use pH7CMS as a RESTful Web app and since that version, all pH7CMS installation has a unique API key in pH7CMS config.ini file. Integration to external software/site or mobile app (such iOS & Android) is possible with minimum modification and maximum security. Better Geo recognition has also been implemented.
 pH7CMS 1.2.5 has a lot of bugfixes and improvements (including better displaying on small devices with the responsive theme)
 pH7CMS 1.2.7 has been released on the 24th of December just for Christmas. It has a lot of improvements such as better banner positions increasing the click-through-rate. The benchmark visible when pH7CMS is on the development mode. Better search experiences with the new SISE (Smart Intuitive Search Engine) and better translation are now done. Finally, the new release has a much better CSV User Importer and is now 100% compatible with PHP 7+.
 1.2.8, Several improvements and bug fixes as usual and add the possibility to enable/disable system modules/features 
 pH7CMS 1.4 integrates the Two-Factor Authentication (2FA) working with TOTP mobile apps.
 pH7CMS 2.0 adds a nudity detector for easier moderation of any photos uploaded 
 Starting from version 16.3.0, the software is distributed under MIT license instead of GPLv3.
 Starting from pH7Builder 16.5.0, the software isn't supporting PHP 5.6 anymore. In order to use the newer features offered by PHP, v16.5.0 requires at least PHP 7.4.

System modules 

pH7Builder is included with 31 natives modules

 Admin Panel
 Affiliate
 Blog
 Chat
 Chatroulette
 Comment
 Connect (Facebook, Twitter, and Google Connect)
 Contact
 Error (Allows the customization of error pages (e.g., 403, 404, 500))
 Field (Profile Fields)
 Forum
 Game
 Hot or Not (Random Profile Photo Rating)
 IM (Instant Messenger) 
 Invite (Invite friends by sending an invitation email)
 Password Manager (Requesting new password for User, Admin, and Affiliate Modules)
 Love Calculator
 Mail
 Newsletter
 Note
 Page
 Payment
 Picture
 Report (report an abusing user/content)
 User
 Video
 Webcam
 XML (RSS & Sitemap generator)
 HelloWorld (Example Module for mod developers)

Template engines
pH7Builder Core uses its homemade pH7Tpl and the installer uses Smarty. In addition, pH7CMS is also included with the PH7Xsl, a XSLT PHP template engine.

Installation
In almost every version, the installation of the software is improved and is easier. pH7CMS is also included with a Web setup wizard and is also available on Softaculous.

Awards and Recognition
 Recommended Social Networking Software by BestHostingSearch 

 pH7Builder won the "2022 Open Source Excellence" on SourceForge.

References

External links
 pH7Builder.com Official pH7Builder website
 pH7Builder on GitHub Official GitHub repository
 pH7Builder on SourceForge Free version available on SourceForge

Social networking services
Online dating applications
Blog software
Photo software